Eventyr (Once Upon a Time) is a tone poem for orchestra composed by Frederick Delius in 1917. It was given its premiere in London on 11 January 1919, under the direction of Henry Wood. "Eventyr" means "adventure", and the inspiration for the piece was a fairy tale from Norway. After a twenty-bar introduction, a fantastic theme is played first by the bassoons and then by the other woodwinds. The second subject is presented by the strings and gains in intensity with the addition of another subject in counterpoint. Several climactic moments follow before the creation of a fairy world, dominated by a descending chromatic theme for strings, celesta, and harp. The piece is concluded with the return of earlier material, followed by a quiet closing section.

References
David Ewen, Encyclopedia of Concert Music.  New York; Hill and Wang, 1959.

1917 compositions
Symphonic poems by Frederick Delius